Juan Andrés y Morell (15 February 1740 in Planes, Alicante12 January 1817 in Rome) was a Spanish Jesuit priest, Christian humanist and literary critic of the Age of Enlightenment. He was the creator of world history and comparative literature (i.e. of Letters and Sciences of the eighteenth century) through the most important and extensive of his works: Dell'Origine, progressi e stato d'ogni attuale letteratura (1st ed. Italian, Parma, 1782–1799) – Origen, progresos y estado actual de toda la literatura (Madrid, 1784–1806, but was incomplete as it did not include the part devoted to the ecclesiastical sciences) only recently restored to a critical and complete edition. He is one of the most important authors, together with Lorenzo Hervás, Antonio Eximeno, Francisco Javier Clavijero or Celestino Mutis, of the Spanish Universalist School of the 18th century.

Scholar
He was considered an extraordinarily intellectual figure in the Europe of his time, but was ignored for much of the nineteenth and twentieth centuries. This was for several reasons, as much
circumstantial as general interest. Andrés trained in the former University of Gandia, Juas a Professor of Rhetoric, and a young Juansuit forced into exile in Italy 1767. He first settled in Ferrara, and then the Marquis of Bianchi welcomed him to his palace in Mantua. Here, he enjoyed life with the Marquis's family, until the arrival of Napoleon, more than twenty years of happy and productive stay that allowed him to complete the major part of his work. 

In England it was studied and followed mostly by Henry Hallam.

Literary works
Andrés is also the author of, among many other titles, Family Letters, (Tour of Italy) (Madrid and Valencia, 1786–1800), the Spanish-language work is one of the most important of its kind and a major European piece, mainly composed of a literary-scientific and especially bibliographic journey. The thoughts of Andrés, settled in the late neoclassical Age of Enlightenment responds with a strong Spanish-Italian tradition not only identifiable with the big fellow Jesuits, victims of expulsion, most prominently Lorenzo Hervás, builder of comparative linguistics, and the great music theorist Antonio Eximeno together with whom were seen as the nucleus of the eighteenth century School of Spanish Universalists, but further amplified the line represented by Ignacio de Luzan, Ludovico Antonio Muratori and the great pioneer and genius Giambattista Vico. Andrés, with his sight almost gone at the end of his life, spent his final professional occupation in charge of the Royal Library of Naples, to finally die in Rome in the protection of his religious congregation. The first and most important volume (given the main feelings of the sense of self and the critical nature of the new edition) of his major work was republished in Madrid in 1997, it Juas completed in 2002.

External links 
 Biblioteca Humanismoeuropa 
 Ediciones Instituto Juan Andrés 
 Revista Recensión 3: Las Escuelas de Salamanca y Universalista

References

18th-century Spanish Jesuits
Spanish librarians
Spanish literary critics
Spanish-language writers
Italian-language writers
1740 births
1817 deaths
Comparative literature academics
Members of the Göttingen Academy of Sciences and Humanities
18th-century philosophers